The CYLD lysine 63 deubiquitinase gene, also termed the CYLD gene, CYLD is an evolutionary ancient gene found to be present as far back on the evolutionary scale as in sponges. In humans, this gene is located in band 12.1 on the long (or "q") arm of chromosome 16 and is known to code (i.e. direct the production of) multiple proteins through the process of alternative splicing.

The CYLD gene in known to code for a cytoplasmic protein, termed CYLD lysine 63 deubiquitinase (here termed CYLD protein), which has three cytoskeletal-associated protein-glycine-conserved (CAP-GLY) domains (areas or the protein controlling critical functions). CYLD protein is a deubiquitinating enzyme, i.e. a protease that removes ubiquitin from certain proteins and thereby regulates these proteins' activities. CYLD protein removes ubiquitin from proteins involved in regulating the NF-κB, Wnt, notch, TGF-β, and JNK cell signaling pathways; these pathways normally act to regulate hair formation, cell growth, cell survival, inflammatory responses, and/or tumor development.

The CYLD gene is classified as a tumor suppressor gene, i.e. a gene that regulates cell growth and when inactivated by a mutation leads to uncontrolled cell growth and the formation of tumors. Inactivating mutations in this gene occur in essentially all cases of the CYLD cutaneous syndrome, a hereditary disorder in which individuals develop multiple skin tumors. The CYLD cutaneous syndrome includes three somewhat different forms of the disease: the multiple familial trichoepithelioma-type, Brooke–Spiegler syndrome-type, and familial cylindromatosis-type.  CYLD gene mutations are also associated with T-Cell Acute Lymphoblastic Leukemia, multiple myeloma, hepatocellular carcinoma, neuroblastoma, pancreatic cancer, uterine cancer, stomach cancer, colon cancer, lung cancer, and human papillomavirus-associated cancers.

References

Further reading

External links 
 

Oncogenes